Agustín Hugo Canapino (born January 19, 1990) is an Argentine racing driver signed to Juncos Hollinger Racing in the IndyCar Series. He has run in different series, with major success in Turismo Carretera (TC). He is the son of Alberto Canapino, a renowned race car mechanic in Argentina.

Career overview
With no previous racing experience, Agustín made his debut in 2005 in the Renault Mégane one-make touring car series. He won races in 2006 and won the championship in 2007. He made his debut that year in TC 2000 and the following year in Top Race and TC Pista, a championship prior to Turismo Carretera that he won that year.

Canapino won the TC and Top Race Torneo Clausura championships in 2010. Between 2011 and 2017 he won all the titles in Top Race (with a Mercedes-Benz prototype), except for 2015, which was won by Matías Rodríguez. Won the Súper TC 2000 championship in 2016 and 2021 with Chevrolet Argentina factory team and was a three-time TC champion between 2017 and 2019 with the Canapino Sport team (led by his father). He has also run a few races at Stock Car Brasil.

In 2019 he was called by Ricardo Juncos, director of Juncos Racing, to race the 24 Hours of Daytona in DPi. Along with Will Owen, René Binder and Kyle Kaiser, he finished eighth in the class. He also raced at Sebring.

Canapino was awarded the Olimpia de Oro 2018 for the best Argentine sportsman of the year. He is together with Juan Manuel Fangio, the only racing driver to win this award. He received the Olimpia de Plata of the discipline four times. His father, Alberto Canapino, died on February 15, 2021, from COVID-19.

In October of 2022, his former team Juncos Racing announced that Canapino would take part in 2 demonstation runs to be held in Argentina, where Canapino would drive one of the team's Dallara IR18 IndyCars from the 2022 series, to be held in November 2022. In preparation for these demonstation runs, the team entered Canapino in a private IndyCar driver evaluation test at Sebring. Following this, Canapino was confirmed as the team's second driver for the full 2023 championship, partnering Callum Ilott.

Racing record

Racing career summary

Turismo Carretera summary 
 Races: 212
 Wins: 15
 Heat wins: 52
 Debut: February 8, 2009 - Chevrolet Chevy - Mar de Ajó circuit
 First win: November 28, 2010 - Chevrolet Chevy - Buenos Aires circuit
 Last win: May 29, 2022 - Chevrolet Chevy - Rafaela circuit
 Pole positions: 8
 Podiums: 54
 Titles: 4 - 2010, 2017, 2018 and 2019.
 Full Seasons: 14

Complete TC 2000 Championship results
(key) (Races in bold indicate pole position) (Races in italics indicate fastest lap)

† As Canapino was a guest driver, he was ineligible to score championship points.

Complete WeatherTech SportsCar Championship results
(key) (Races in bold indicate pole position; races in italics indicate fastest lap)

24 Hours of Daytona results

American open–wheel racing results

IndyCar Series

(key)

References

External links
 
 

1990 births
Living people
Sportspeople from Buenos Aires Province
Argentine racing drivers
TC 2000 Championship drivers
Turismo Carretera drivers
Top Race V6 drivers
24 Hours of Daytona drivers
WeatherTech SportsCar Championship drivers
Súper TC 2000 drivers
Juncos Hollinger Racing drivers
Hitech Grand Prix drivers
Formula 3 Sudamericana drivers
IndyCar Series drivers